Claire Lutz (born November 22, 1986 in St. Joseph, Michigan) is an American female kite surfer and lives in Orlando.  Claire has been a presence in slider riding in kiteboarding, cable riding, and she’s been featured in publications and websites from Alliance Wake to Stance Planet. She is currently starring in a YouTube series, Wake Town.
She is sponsored by Liquid Force, Jetpilot, Sensi Bikinis and custom projects sunglasses.

Titles 
1st place Triple-S 2012 Women’s Winching
3rd place Triple-S 2012 Women’s Sliders
2nd place Triple-S 2013 Women’s Sliders
2nd place Triple-S 2014 Women’s Sliders
Finalist of "Who is the “Most Influential Girl Kitesurfer” for 2012" contest
Invited woman rider Triple-S 2015

References

External links 
Official site

1986 births
American kitesurfers
Living people
Female kitesurfers